The South African International Exhibition held in Cape Town, Cape Colony was a world's fair held in 1877 which opened on 15 February by Henry Bartle Frere.

Location
The exhibition was held in the grounds of the Lodge de Goede Hoop which was being used for the Parliament of the Cape of Good Hope in a building erected for the exhibition. The building was built of wood, iron, and glass which measured 184 x 78 feet; 56 feet high; and cost £10,027.

Exhibits
During 1876 Signor Cagli had canvassed American and European industries to exhibit “manufactures of all kinds” which were to be grouped in 10 classes: "alimentation", chemicals (perfume, medicine and surgical equipment), furniture, fabric and jewellery, transport, hardware, machinery, agriculture, science and education, and miscellany.

Exhibitors included Wertheim safes; Taylor's sewing machines, who won a medal; Sheffield based Samuel Marshall who showed hooks, hay knives, scythes and sheep shears and linen manufacturers Rylands & Sons who won a prize (and another a year later at the Paris exhibition). 

There were 395 exhibitors from 14 nations: 
Africa: Cape Colony, Natal, Orange Free State, Transvaal 
America: USA  
Asia: India  
Europe: Austria, Belgium, Bohemia, France, Germany, Great Britain, Ireland, Italy, Prussia, Sweden, Switzerland.

Aftermath
After the exhibition, the main building was used as an assembly hall and a theatre, known as the Exhibition Theatre. In the afternoon of 21 February 1892, carpenters and scenery painters were preparing for a new play when a fire broke out about 3:30, near the theatre entrance. In less than one hour, the entire building was destroyed along with the adjoining Masonic Lodge and Native Affairs Office.

References

1877 establishments in the Cape Colony
February 1877 events
Festivals in Cape Town
Events in Cape Town
World's fairs in Africa